Garrett Edward Johnson (born December 31, 1975) is a former American football defensive tackle. He played college football at Illinois. Professionally, Johnson played for the Barcelona Dragons of NFL Europe and the New England Patriots of the NFL.

Early life and college career
Johnson was born in Belleville, Illinois and graduated from Belleville East High School, where he lettered in football, basketball, and track. Johnson attended the University of Illinois at Urbana-Champaign and played at defensive tackle for the Illinois Fighting Illini from 1995 to 1998; his father Herschel played on the defensive line for Illinois in the late 1960s. A speech communications major, Johnson played in 39 games with 32 starts, recording 182 total tackles including 8.5 sacks and 22 tackles for loss, four fumble recoveries, and one forced fumble.

Professional career
Following the 1999 NFL Draft, Johnson first signed as an undrafted free agent with the New England Patriots. He spent the 1999 season on the practice squad.

In the spring of 2000, Johnson played in 10 games for the Barcelona Dragons of NFL Europe, recording 21 tackles, one forced fumble, one pass deflected, and 4.0 sacks. In the 2000 NFL season, Johnson played in eight games with two starts for the New England Patriots, recording 11 tackles and a fumble recovery. He was cut by the Patriots on September 2, 2001 after the preseason.

On January 22, 2002, he signed with the Denver Broncos. The Broncos waived Johnson on final cuts on September 1. The San Francisco 49ers claimed Johnson off waivers the next day but waived him on September 16.

References 

1975 births
Living people
People from Belleville, Illinois
Players of American football from Illinois
American football defensive tackles
Illinois Fighting Illini football players
New England Patriots players
San Francisco 49ers players
Barcelona Dragons players